AirConsole is a gaming platform developed by Zurich-based startup N-Dream. It created the concept in January 2015, with around $1.4 million in initial capital. Soon after, N-Dream conducted a game development competition, where developers were encouraged to create their own game on the AirConsole platform.

In 2016, the gaming company was the winner of the 2016 German Developer Innovation Prize. Their game, Castle Hustle was nominated for the Best Student Game Award at the Ludicious Game Festival in 2017. 

As of March 2023, AirConsole has over 180+ casual games exclusive to its platform across all genres: racing, action, adventure, strategy, sports, quiz, drawing games and more. All games have their own smartphone optimised controls. Next to the AirConsole exclusive titles, there is a selection of games available from Nintendo Switch, XBox and Steam. Some of their best ranking games include Let's Cook Together, GoKartGo!Air!, Mega Monster Party, Ludo and The Neighbourhood.

In 2022 it was announced that BMW would use AirConsole for in-car entertainment.

AirConsole’s mission is to bring the $152bn mobile gaming industry to every living room TV and in-car entertainment system. Using cutting-edge cloud OTA delivery technology, the gaming platform is instantly accessible and hardware-free.

References

Cloud gaming services